John Christopher Velis is an American state legislator and Democratic member of the Massachusetts Senate since 2020. He previously represented the 2nd Hampden and Hampshire district, which includes his hometown of Westfield, and currently represents the Hampden and Hampshire district after the 2020 census. Prior his election to the state senate, Velis was a member of the Massachusetts House of Representatives from 2014 to 2020.

Early life, education, and career

Velis was born in Westfield, Massachusetts to Susan and Jim Velis, one of three children with his brother Adam and sister Jennifer. His uncle, Peter Velis, served as a Hampden Superior Court Judge from 1999–2012 and member of the Massachusetts House of Representatives, where he represented the 5th Hampden district (Southampton, Montgomery, and Westfield) from 1973–1979. He was educated at Westfield High School and graduated in 1998, attended Roxbury Community College, graduated from University of South Florida in 2004 with a Bachelor of Science in political science, and from Suffolk University Law School in 2008 with a Juris Doctor.

Prior to practicing law with his uncle, Velis spent time a number of government settings holding internships in the Hampden County District attorney's office, Hampden County Superior Court and the Massachusetts Treasurer's office. He was also an intern at the White House during the term of President George W. Bush. After returning to civilian life, Velis was appointed by Westfield Mayor Daniel Knapik to the Commission for Citizens with Disabilities and is a volunteer basketball coach for the Greater Westfield Boys & Girls Club.

Political career

Massachusetts House of Representatives
In 2014, Velis declared his candidacy for the Massachusetts House of Representatives, representing the 4th Hampden District seat held by incumbent Republican state representative Donald Humason, Jr. During the same year, however, Humason won a special election to the Massachusetts Senate after State Senator Michael Knapik resigned to take a job at Westfield State University, triggering another special election. He was unopposed in the Democratic primary and defeated Republican opponent At-large City Councilor Dan Allie in the general election on April 1, becoming the first Democrat to represent Westfield in 35 years. He began serving the remaining seven months of Humason's House term and campaigned for a first full-term in the regular November election, defeating Allie in a rematch.

In 2016 and 2018, he was re-elected to a respective second and third term unopposed.

Massachusetts Senate
On November 8, 2019, Velis announced his candidacy for the Massachusetts Senate's 2nd Hampden and Hampshire district seat following his predecessor Donald Humason, Jr.'s election as Mayor of Westfield. He was challenged by Republican John Cain of Southwick, a businessman and former Navy officer. On May 19, 2020, with the election delayed by the COVID-19 pandemic, Velis won the Senate seat over Cain with 64 percent of the vote, becoming the first Democrat in 25 years to represent the 2nd Hampden and Hampshire district. He defeated Cain in a rematch. Velis was re-elected to a second term in 2022, defeating Agawam city councilor Cecilia Calabrese.

Towns represented
In Hampden County: Agawam, Chicopee (Ward 7 - Precinct 7A, Precinct 9A), Holyoke, Montgomery, Russell, Westfield, and West Springfield. In Hampshire County: Easthampton and Southampton.

Military service
Velis enlisted in the United States Army Reserve in 2011 and is currently serving in the Judge Advocate General (JAG) Corps as part of the 3rd Legal Operations Detachment. While on active duty in Afghanistan, Velis participated in the War in Afghanistan's Operation Enduring Freedom and taught the Rule of Law to tribal leaders and brought warring parties together to achieve peaceful solutions, overseeing all ISAF-NATO rule of law efforts throughout the Zabul Province in the war-torn nation.

In August 2017, Velis was sent to South Korea for about a month to participate in joint military training exercises with the U.S. Army and allies. On July 4, 2018, Velis was promoted to the rank of major while on deployment in Afghanistan.

Political positions

Velis describes himself as a fiscally conservative Democrat.  Prior to running for state representative in 2014, Velis described himself as a fiscally conservative Republican.

Taxes
Velis supported a $36.3 billion fiscal year 2015 budget with no tax increases and voted in favor of in-state tuition for veterans at Massachusetts State colleges and universities at about 12:00 AM on Thursday, May 1, securing about $165,000 in the house budget for the city of Westfield. How the funds are allocated, $100,000 to Noble Hospital will increase ease of access to the front entrance for older adults and the disabled; $50,000 grant for new Senior Center furnishings to make it more inviting to a wider range of older adults, host more activities and increase its use; and $15,000 to stimulate the local business community.

He did not vote on Bill H.4111, a bill that appropriates funds for the expansion of the Boston Convention and Exhibition Center; rather deciding to abstain from voting, showing neither support or opposition.

He voted in favor of increasing the minimum wage from $8.00 per hour to $11.00 per hour by 2017.

He voted for the 2018 Car Rental Tax Surcharge, which added a $2 tax surcharge to automobile rentals.

Education
Velis cosponsored Bill H.4200 with Representative John Scibak, a petition relative to the scheduling of high school athletic contests. He was one of 35 legislators to vote "no" on Bill H.4091, a bill that authorizes the expansion of charter schools in certain communities.

Disability rights
Velis cast his first vote in support of Bill H.4047, a bill relative to assisting individuals with autism and other intellectual or developmental disabilities. This legislation is intended to improve educational opportunities and access to services for people with autism or other intellectual disabilities. Bill H.4047 would also create a special commission to look at state policies dealing with individuals with autism, and allow families to set aside money tax free in savings accounts to pay and plan for the long-term care and housing of children with intellectual disabilities.

Transportation
Velis has cosponsored Bill S.2169 with Senator Donald Humason, Jr., a petition with the approval of the mayor and city council for legislation relative to the acceptance of Paper Mill Road as a public way in the city of Westfield.

Crime
Velis voted in support of Bill S.714, an act relative to juvenile life without parole sentences. Under the measure, people convicted of first-degree murder for crimes that occurred while they were between the ages of 14 and 18 could be eligible for parole after serving 20 to 25 years in prison. For crimes that were deemed to involve deliberate premeditated malice or extreme atrocity or cruelty, the wait would be 25 to 30 years.

Manufacturing
Velis has cosponsored Docket HD4311 with Representatives Diana DiZoglio and Jonathan Zlotnik, otherwise known as An Act Relative to the Taxation of Inventory in Manufacturing. According to DiZoglio, the bill is designed to gradually eliminate the inventory tax manufacturers pay on raw materials over a period of four years.

Gun rights
In 2015, Velis introduced legislation on behalf of Gun Owners Action League (GOAL) and the Massachusetts affiliate of the National Rifle Association that would create a commission to review policies regarding the alleged dangers of gun free zones, which GOAL said had become targets for terrorists and murderers. Velis is opposed to legislation limiting the gun rights of law-abiding citizens. He was one of 11 Democrats to vote against House Speaker Robert DeLeo's bill aimed at preventing gun violence.

Electoral history
State Legislature

See also
 2019–2020 Massachusetts legislature
 2021–2022 Massachusetts legislature

References

External links
 Legislative website
 Campaign website
 Past (MA House) legislative website
 Past (MA House) campaign website
 Biography, voting record, and interest group ratings at Project Vote Smart

|-

|-

Massachusetts Democrats
Living people
People from Westfield, Massachusetts
United States Army officers
University of South Florida alumni
Suffolk University Law School alumni
Massachusetts lawyers
1979 births
21st-century American lawyers
21st-century American politicians
United States Army personnel of the War in Afghanistan (2001–2021)
Military personnel from Massachusetts